Vitori Buatava (born 1 November 1985) is a Fijian rugby union footballer. He currently plays for the Zhermack Badia rugby team and the Fiji national rugby union team and usually plays as a Scrum-half. 

He was part of the Fiji team at the 2011 Rugby World Cup where he played in four matches, he made his international debut in 2007.

References

External links

1985 births
Living people
Fijian rugby union players
Fiji international rugby union players
People from Melbourne
I-Taukei Fijian people
Rugby union scrum-halves